Muhammad Abdul may refer to:

People 

Muhammad Abdul Bari chairman of the East London Mosque
Muhammad Abdul Aleem Siddiqi
Muhammad Abdul Rashid Pakistani field hockey player
Muhammad Abdul Malek Bangladeshi Islamic scholar
Mohammad Abdul-Wali Yemeni diplomat
Muhammad Abdul, member of the comedy rock band Nanowar of Steel